José Guadalupe Villarreal Gutiérrez is a Mexican politician from the Institutional Revolutionary Party. From 2002 to 2003 he served as Deputy of the LVIII Legislature of the Mexican Congress representing Nuevo León.

References

Year of birth missing (living people)
Living people
Politicians from Nuevo León
Institutional Revolutionary Party politicians
21st-century Mexican politicians
Deputies of the LVIII Legislature of Mexico
Members of the Chamber of Deputies (Mexico) for Nuevo León